Cape McNab is a cape,  high, which forms the south end of Buckle Island in the Balleny Islands of Antarctica. It was named for John McNab, second mate of the schooner Eliza Scott, who made a sketch of the Balleny Islands when they were discovered by John Balleny in 1839.

References

Headlands of the Balleny Islands